Ten ships of the French Navy have borne the name Éole in honour of Aeolus

Naval vessels named Éole 
 , a 36-gun ship of the line
 , a 44-gun ship of the line
 , a 64-gun ship of the line
 , a 64-gun ship of the line
 , a  74-gun ship of the line
 , a  64-gun ship of the line, was named Éole before taking her definitive name
  (1798), a xebec
  was an 18-gun corvette that the British Royal Navy captured in 1799 and took into service as HMS Nimrod. After the Royal Navy sold her in 1811 she became a whaler and was last listed in 1820.
  (1814), a Téméraire-class 74-gun ship of the line, was renamed Éole under the Bourbon Restoration
 , a 100-gun , was started as Éole before taking her definitive name

Other vessels

See also

References
 

French Navy ship names